Darshan Singh Yadav was a politician from Samajwadi Party was a Member of the Parliament of India representing Uttar Pradesh in the Rajya Sabha, the upper house of the Indian Parliament.

He has completed his B.Com.  at A.K. College at Shikohabad under Agra University.

He died on 30 August 2018.

References

External links 
 Detailed Profile: Shri Darshan Singh Yadav

Samajwadi Party politicians
Rajya Sabha members from Uttar Pradesh
1944 births
2018 deaths
Dr. Bhimrao Ambedkar University alumni
Samajwadi Party politicians from Uttar Pradesh